Khansar (Urdu: خانسر; Saraiki: خانسر) is a union council in Bhakkar District, Pakistan.

Populated places in Bhakkar District

hi:भक्कर
pt:Bhakkar
simple:Bhakkar